This article concerns the period 279 BC – 270 BC.

References

270s BC